Brzuśnik  is a village in the administrative district of Gmina Radziechowy-Wieprz, within Żywiec County, Silesian Voivodeship, in southern Poland.

The village has an approximate population of 840.

References

Villages in Żywiec County